Skanstullsbron (Swedish: "The Fortlet Tollgate Bridge") is a bridge in central Stockholm, Sweden. Overpassing the older bridge Skansbron, it connects the major island Södermalm to the southern district Johanneshov.

The first proposal for an elevated bridge stretching over the canal Hammarbykanalen was produced in 1921, before work on the lower Skansbron bridge began in 1923. It remained the favoured bridge design to solve the increasing traffic load of the area during the 1920s and 1930s and was approved by the city council in 1939. World War II led to shortage of both finance and material, but work was started in 1944 and the new bridge was inaugurated in 1947.

Skanstullsbron is a concrete double viaduct, with one bridge for vehicles and pedestrians and the other for the metro. Its total length is 574 metres of which 403 metres consists of the 16 spans of the southern beam bridge. The three central spans, 118, 112, and 106 metres long, offer a maximum horizontal clearance of 32 metres and a panoramic view of the surrounding city.

See also
 List of bridges in Stockholm
 Johanneshovsbron
 Fredriksdalsbron
 Tvärbanan

References

External links

Bridges in Stockholm
Bridges completed in 1947
Rail infrastructure in Stockholm County